The Cathedral of Saint Elias and Saint Gregory the Illuminator is a cathedral of the Armenian Catholic Church in Debbas Square in downtown Beirut, Lebanon. Construction was funded in 1928 by Pope Pius XI. It is the cathedra of the Armenian Catholic Patriarchate of Cilicia. The order in which the two eponymous saints  are presented in the cathedral's name, Saint Elias and Saint Gregory the Illuminator, is not fixed.

The architecture of the cathedral reflects some changes from traditional Armenian architecture, drawing artistic inspiration from Rome.

See also
Architecture of Lebanon

References

Armenian-Lebanese culture in Beirut
Cathedrals in Beirut
Catholic churches in Beirut
Armenian Catholic churches in Lebanon
Eastern Catholic cathedrals in Lebanon
Armenian Catholic cathedrals
Church buildings with domes
1920s establishments in Lebanon